Theodore A. Kennedy (February 7, 1865 in Henry, Illinois – October 28, 1907 in St. Louis, Missouri), Ted was a professional baseball player who played pitcher in the Major Leagues from -. He would play for the Louisville Colonels, Philadelphia Athletics, and Chicago White Stockings. Inventor of the baseball catcher's mitt, he sold his patents to the A.G. Spalding Company and opened a baseball school, specializing in teaching the curveball, and also manufactured sporting goods - specifically baseball gloves and catcher's mitts. He also invented a pitching machine and was developing the first electric scoreboard at the time of his death.

Married to Regina. They had four children: Fannie (1887), Mabel (1889), Herbert (1891) and Viola (1896).

In 1976, Kennedy's grandson (Viola's son), Dick Metzger, donated his grandfather's collection of memorable to the Baseball Hall of Fame library. The Ted Kennedy Collection includes: Two scrapbooks of lessons, which are hand drawn, handwritten and typed; his glove patterns, with each piece cut out, ready to be assembled; flyers, brochures and articles with playing instructions to pitchers and players; and how to order a glove through the mail. Another donation of memorabilia was donated to the St. Louis Cardinals Hall of Fame.

Buried in Calvary Cemetery in St. Louis, Mo.

External links

1865 births
1907 deaths
Major League Baseball pitchers
Louisville Colonels players
Chicago White Stockings players
Philadelphia Athletics (AA) players
19th-century baseball players
Omaha Omahogs players
Keokuk Hawkeyes players
Des Moines Hawkeyes players
LaCrosse Freezers players
Des Moines Prohibitionists players
Omaha Lambs players
Dubuque (minor league baseball) players
Baseball players from Illinois
People from Henry, Illinois